The Encyclopedia of Science Fiction and Fantasy (sometimes named The Encyclopedia of Science Fiction and Fantasy through 1968) is a three volume reference work on science fiction and fantasy, edited by Donald H. Tuck and published by Advent.  

Volume 1 (Who's Who, A-L) was published in 1974. Volume 2 (Who's Who, M-Z) was published in 1978. Volume 3 (Miscellaneous) was published in 1982. 

The first two volumes contain about 2500 articles. The work mostly covers period of 1945-1968. 

Volume 3 won a Hugo Award in the Nonfiction category.

References 

20th-century encyclopedias
Encyclopedias of literature
Science fiction studies
1974 non-fiction books
1978 non-fiction books
1982 non-fiction books
American encyclopedias
Hugo Award for Best Non-Fiction Book winning works